Jeanette C. Takamura was the second Assistant Secretary for Aging at the Administration on Aging within the U.S. Department of Health and Human Services. She was appointed by President Clinton in 1997 and served in the position until 2001. Before that, she served as the Deputy Director for Administration of the Hawaii State Department of Health and the Director of the Executive Office on Aging within the State of Hawaii's Office of the Governor. Takamura is the Dean and Professor of the Columbia University School of Social Work. She previously held the position of Edward R. Roybal Professor in Applied Gerontology and Public Service at California State University, Los Angeles.

External links
Columbia University School of Social Work

References 

Columbia University faculty
Columbia University School of Social Work faculty
Living people
United States Assistant Secretaries for Aging
Year of birth missing (living people)